The Institute for Palestine Studies (IPS) is the oldest independent nonprofit public service research institute in the Arab world. It was established and incorporated in Beirut, Lebanon, in 1963 and has since served as a model for other such institutes in the region. It is the only institute in the world solely concerned with analyzing and documenting Palestinian affairs and the Arab–Israeli conflict. It also publishes scholarly journals and has published over 600 books, monographs, and documentary collections in English, Arabic and French—as well as its renowned quarterly academic journals: Journal of Palestine Studies, Jerusalem Quarterly, and Majallat al-Dirasat al-Filistiniyyah. IPS's Library in Beirut is the largest in the Arab world specializing in Palestinian affairs, the Arab–Israeli conflict, and Judaica.

It is led by a Board of Trustees comprising some forty scholars, businessmen, and public figures representing almost all Arab countries. The institute currently maintains offices in Beirut, Paris, Washington, and Ramallah.

Organization

The institute is independent of government, party, or political organization. IPS activities are financed by income from its endowment, contributions and gifts from donors, and sales of its publications.

History

In 2006, the Institute for Palestine Studies launched the Congressional Monitor project, which tracks every legislative initiative introduced in the U.S. Congress that mentions Palestine or Israel or has bearing on the Palestinian–Israeli conflict. The project is online and users can access the legislation as well as the congressional record from which it is drawn through the Congressional Monitor Database. Tips on using the database as well as a quick guide to the U.S. legislative process are provided.

Library
The institute's library is located at the institute's headquarters in Beirut. It is the largest in the Arab world specializing in Palestinian affairs, the Arab–Israeli conflict, and Judaica, with over 40,000 volumes, 400 current periodicals, 5,000 reels of film plus newspapers, maps, documents, and a large collection of private papers. It is also interested in studying and promoting knowledge of Hebrew.

Publications

The institute publishes three quarterly journals in English and Arabic. These are independently edited and published from Washington, Paris, Jerusalem, and Beirut respectively. The journals are:
 The Journal of Palestine Studies, which was established in 1971. It is published and distributed by the University of California Press on behalf of the institute. The current editor is Rashid Khalidi of Columbia University.
 The French quarterly, Revue d'études palestiniennes, which began publication in 1982, was independently edited and produced by The Institute for Palestine Studies – Paris. The Revue was printed and distributed by Editions de Minuit. (previous editor Samir Kassir)
 The Arabic language quarterly, Majallat al-Dirasat al-Filastiniyah, was founded in 1990. It is edited in London and Beirut and is simultaneously reprinted in Ramallah in the West Bank for distribution in the Palestinian Territories. Elias Khoury, renowned Lebanese author is the Editor of the Majallat al-Dirasat al-Filastiniyah.
 The Jerusalem Quarterly (JQ) (Arabic: Hawliyat al-Quds) was conceived in 1998 as the Jerusalem Quarterly File, and is published by the Institute of Jerusalem Studies (IJS), an affiliate of the Institute for Palestine Studies. Jerusalem Quarterly publishes historical features and contemporary analysis of aspects of city life and reviews. The journal is available quarterly online, and in print copy through paid subscription.

It has also published over 600 books. It has published many first-person Palestinian accounts of the 1948 Arab–Israeli War.

Board of trustees
The institute is led by a Board of Trustees composed of Arab scholars, businessmen, and public figures. A volunteer executive committee, elected by the Board, manage the regular activities. The trustees come from most Arab countries, including Algeria, Bahrain, Egypt, Jordan, Kuwait, Lebanon, Qatar, Saudi Arabia, United Arab Emirates and Yemen.

See also
 Education in the Palestinian territories
 List of Palestinian universities

References

External links
 
 Journal of Palestine Studies
 Jerusalem Quarterly

Non-governmental organizations involved in the Israeli–Palestinian conflict
Palestinian think tanks
Middle Eastern studies
Think tanks established in 1963
1963 establishments in Lebanon
Think tanks based in Lebanon